The 1952 International cricket season was from April 1957 to August 1957, which consisted only a single international tour.

Season overview

June

India in England

References

1952 in cricket